Paqui is an American brand of tortilla chips made by Amplify Snack Brands, Inc, a subsidiary of The Hershey Company. Its Carolina Reaper chips, sold individually wrapped, are known for being one of the spiciest flavors sold.

History

Doug Lyon, a veteran of the advertising industry, and Alissa Bassana founded Paqui in Austin in 2008. SkinnyPop acquired Paqui in 2015, after which Lyon became the parent company's vice president of creative and innovation. After SkinnyPop later reincorporated as Amplify Snack Brands, The Hershey Company acquired Amplify in 2017.

Reception

In 2017, a reviewer for Refinery29 rated Paqui's flavor line positively, describing the chips as "gourmet-ified Doritos." PopSugar recommended Paqui's Nacho Cheese Especial and Very Verde Good flavors in 2016, and the brand's Wild Wild Ranch flavor in 2017.

One Chip Challenge 
The "One Chip Challenge" is an internet challenge promoted by Amplify Snack Brands since 2016. Participants must eat one Carolina Reaper chip and avoid eating or drinking anything afterwards. An anchor for KWGN-TV vomited on live television after trying the challenge. Celebrities including Alexandria Ocasio-Cortez, Shaquille O'Neal, Joel Embiid, Lil Yachty, and Sean Evans have tried the challenge. Many TikTokers have tried it and required medical attention.

In 2022, the chips sold for the One Chip Challenge turned people's tongues bright blue, to deter cheating. In September 2022, the challenge was banned by Huerfano School District RE-1 in Huerfano County, Colorado, as many children of their schools were accepting the challenge and becoming hospitalized The One Chip Challenge has also been banned from Lodi High School in Lodi, California and from schools in Pearland Independent School District in Pearland, Texas.

References

External links

Brand name snack foods
Spicy foods
The Hershey Company brands